{{DISPLAYTITLE:C9H14O}}
The molecular formula C9H14O may refer to:

 Isophorone (α-isophorone)
 β-Isophorone
 trans,cis-2,6-Nonadienal
 Phorone

Molecular formulas